is a railway station on the Ōito Line in Azumino, Nagano, Japan, operated by East Japan Railway Company (JR East).

Lines
Azusabashi Station is served by the Ōito Line and is 5.2 kilometers from the starting point of the line at Matsumoto Station.

Station layout

The station consists of one ground-level side platform serving a single bi-directional track, connected to the station building by a level crossing. The station is staffed.

History
Azusabashi Station opened on 6 January 1915. With the privatization of Japanese National Railways (JNR) on 1 April 1987, the station came under the control of JR East. A new station building was completed in 2015.

Passenger statistics
In fiscal 2015, the station was used by an average of 452 passengers daily (boarding passengers only).

Surrounding area
Azusa River

See also
 List of railway stations in Japan

References

External links

 JR East station information 

Railway stations in Nagano Prefecture
Ōito Line
Railway stations in Japan opened in 1915
Stations of East Japan Railway Company
Azumino, Nagano